Tredegar can refer to:

 Tredegar, a town in Wales
 Tredegar Iron and Coal Company, a Welsh iron company
 Tredegar Medical Aid Society, a friendly society
 Tredegar General Hospital
 Recreation Ground, Tredegar
 Tredegar Town F.C., a football club
 Tredegar RFC, a rugby club
 Tredegar Ironsides RFC
 Tredegar Town Band
 Tredegar (band), a Welsh heavy metal band
 Tredegar (album)
 Merthyr, Tredegar and Abergavenny Railway
 New Tredegar, a former mining town in Wales
 New Tredegar RFC
 Tredegar Iron Works, an iron works in Richmond, Virginia, USA
 Baron Tredegar, a title in the Peerage of the United Kingdom
 Tredegar House, a stately home in Newport, Wales
 Stable Block, Tredegar House
 Tredegar House Country Park, a park containing Tredegar House
 Tredegar Park, Newport
 Tredegarville, an area of Cardiff, Wales
 Tredegar Square, a Georgian square in Mile End, London
 Lord Tredegar, Bow
 Tredegar Corporation, a manufacturer of plastic films